Depressaria gallicella is a moth of the family Depressariidae. It is found in France and Switzerland.

The wingspan is 22–26 mm.

References

External links
lepiforum.de

Moths described in 1945
Depressaria
Moths of Europe